John Ballard Hitchings (March 6, 1815 – November 17, 1887) was an American shoe manufacturer and politician.

Hitchings was born on March 6, 1815, to Benjamin and Jane Hitchings. His father was a shoemaker and Hitchings and his brother Otis eventually joined their father as partners. On May 17, 1840, Hitchings married Zeruiah J. Sweetser, daughter of Charles and Nancy Mansfield Sweetser. Hitchings held various offices in the town of Saugus, Massachusetts and was a member of the Massachusetts House of Representatives in 1853.

References

1815 births
1887 deaths
Democratic Party members of the Massachusetts House of Representatives
Shoemakers
People from Saugus, Massachusetts